BrainCraft is an educational video series on YouTube created by Australian science communicator Vanessa Hill. Hill's videos use stop motion and paper craft animation to explain neuroscience, psychology and human behavior. BrainCraft is part of the PBS Digital Studios network.

Channel 

BrainCraft videos are about science, with many episodes discussing phenomena related to sleep, memory, brain hacks and the science of food. BrainCraft launched on 23 November 2013 with the video, Is Google Killing Your Memory? In its first few months on YouTube, BrainCraft joined PBS Digital Studios. As of March, 2020, BrainCraft has more than 500,000 subscribers and 30 million views.

Hill has collaborated with many well-known YouTubers such as Vsauce, Mike Rugnetta (PBS Idea Channel, Know Your Meme), Jake Roper (Vsauce3), Dianna Cowern (PBS Physics Girl), and more.

BrainCraft videos have been featured in Scientific American, Huffington Post, Gizmodo and MTV.

See also
 PBS Digital Studios
 It's Okay to be Smart
 Crash Course
 Vsauce

References

Australian non-fiction web series
Online edutainment
Science-related YouTube channels
PBS Digital Studios shows
2010s YouTube series
2020s YouTube series
YouTube channels launched in 2013
Educational and science YouTubers